Keith Hancock (born 3 February 1953) is an Australian former professional tennis player.

Active in the 1970s, Hancock comes from the New South Wales outback settlement of Mount Brown, where his parents were the only inhabitants. They operated the tick quarantine gate for cattle crossing the Queensland border.

Hancock, as a lucky loser from qualifying, made the round of 16 at the 1974 Australian Open and his run included a win over the 11th-seeded Geoff Masters. He lost a close round of 16 match to Colin Dibley, 6–8 in the fifth set.

References

External links
 
 

1953 births
Living people
Australian male tennis players
Tennis people from New South Wales